Mitchell Ross Marsh (born 20 October 1991) is an Australian international cricketer. Marsh has represented Australia in all three forms of cricket, making his debut during the 2011–12 season.

Personal life
Marsh is the second son of Geoff Marsh and younger brother of Shaun Marsh, both of whom have played for the Australian national side. His sister, Melissa Marsh, was a professional basketball player and he is cousin to retired AFL player, Brad Sheppard. He was raised in Perth, Western Australia, where he attended Wesley College.

Domestic career
Marsh made his debut for the Warriors at the age of 17 in February 2009 in a Ford Ranger Cup game at Bunbury. He became the youngest ever player in an Australian domestic one-day game and Western Australia's youngest debutant for 70 years. In April 2009, he played for Australia's under-19 team against India and was the team captain during the 2010 Under-19 Cricket World Cup. Under his leadership Australia won the tournament, Marsh having a successful tournament scoring 201 runs, including a match winning 97 in the semi-final against Sri Lanka.

Marsh was signed by Deccan Chargers for the 2010 Indian Premier League and in 2011 was bought by Pune Warriors, the team coached at the time by his father. He played for Pune for the three years that the team existed and in 2016 and 2017 played for Rising Pune Supergiants for the two seasons that team existed.

Playing for Australia A against India A in July 2014 at Allan Border Field, Marsh scored 211 runs batting seventh in Australia's first innings, his first double century. He and Sam Whiteman, who scored 174 runs, put on 371 runs for the seventh wicket, an Australian record and, at the time, the second-highest seventh-wicket partnership in first-class cricket. The previous Australian record, set by Queenslanders Cassie Andrews and Eric Bensted, had stood since the 1934–35 season.

In 2020 Marsh signed to play in England for Middlesex County Cricket Club in the 2020 t20 Blast competition, but the move was cancelled due to the rescheduling of the competition in the wake of the COVID-19 pandemic. He signed again for the 2021 season, but this move was also cancelled after Marsh was called up to play international cricket for Australia. He was bought by Sunrisers Hyderabad for the 2020 IPL, although he only played in one match of the competition due to injury, and he withdrew from the 2021 Indian Premier League due to bio-bubble fatigue during the pandemic.

In the 2022 IPL Auction, Marsh was bought by the Delhi Capitals.

International career
In September 2011, Marsh was named in Australia's Twenty20 squad to tour South Africa. He was later added to the One Day International squad following Brett Lee's withdrawal due to injury. He made a spectacular debut for Australia in the second T20I match of the series, scoring 36 runs including four sixes, three of which were hit in the final over of the Australian innings. In August 2014, Marsh scored 89 runs against Zimbabwe in first match of the Tri-series at Harare Sports Club, adding 109 runs for the fourth wicket with Glenn Maxwell and contributing to partnerships of 47 and 33 with Aaron Finch and George Bailey. Later in the competition he scored 86 not out against South Africa.

Marsh made his Test match debut for Australia against Pakistan in the United Arab Emirates on 22 October 2014.

Playing regularly in the One Day International side, Marsh took a five-wicket haul against England during the 2015 Cricket World Cup, and scored his maiden ODI century against India in 2016 at the SCG. He was, however, dropped from the Australian Test side after the first Test of the 2016–17 series against South Africa, coming back into the side during the 2017 series against India and playing in two Tests before he suffered an injury. Later in the year, he replaced Peter Handscomb in the third match of 2017–18 Ashes series, scoring his maiden Test century. His first innings score of 181 was one short of his brother Shaun's career best score of 182.

In March 2018, Marsh was fined 20 percent of his match fee and given one demerit point for using offensive language during the second Test between Australia and South Africa, after being dismissed by Kagiso Rabada. The following month, he was awarded a national contract by Cricket Australia for the 2018–19 season and was named as cover for Marcus Stoinis ahead of Australia's 2019 Cricket World Cup match against Pakistan in June 2019. The following month he was named in Australia's squad for the 2019 Ashes series in England, but was not selected for the first four Tests of the series. In the fifth and final match of the series, Marsh took his first five-wicket haul in Test cricket, taking 5/46 in the first innings, but ended on the losing side.

In October 2019, Marsh broke his bowling hand after punching a wall, following his dismissal, during a Sheffield Shield match against Tasmania. As a result, he was forced to miss the start of Australia's Test summer. In April 2020 he was again awarded a central contract ahead of the 2020–21 season and in July 2020 was named in a 26-man preliminary squad of players to begin training ahead of a possible tour to England following the COVID-19 pandemic. In August, Cricket Australia confirmed that the fixtures would be taking place, with Marsh included in the touring party.

In July 2021, in the first Twenty20 International match of Australia's tour of the West Indies, Marsh scored his maiden T20I half-century, scoring 51 runs from 31 deliveries. He continued his good form, scoring another half-century in the following match and in the fourth T20I made 75 runs and took his career best T20I bowling figures of 3/24.

In August 2021, Marsh was named in Australia's squad for the 2021 ICC Men's T20 World Cup. On 14 November 2021, Marsh helped Australia win the 2021 ICC Men's T20 World Cup, scoring 77 runs in the final and earning player of the match.

Achievements
 Named in ICC Men's T20I Team of the Year for the year 2021.

Beyond cricket 

Marsh was also a talented Australian rules footballer early in his career and represented Western Australia at the 2008 AFL Under 18 Championships.

Career best performances

References

External links 

 
 Mitchell Marsh profile at Wisden

 

1991 births
Living people
Australia One Day International cricketers
Australia Test cricketers
Australia Twenty20 International cricketers
Australian cricketers
Cricketers at the 2015 Cricket World Cup
Deccan Chargers cricketers
People educated at Wesley College, Perth
Perth Scorchers cricketers
Pune Warriors India cricketers
Rising Pune Supergiant cricketers
Cricketers from Perth, Western Australia
Western Australia cricketers
Sunrisers Hyderabad cricketers
Mi